Oroko may refer to:

Oroko language
Armel Oroko
Hyacinth Oroko Egbebo